Rodolfo Collazo Tourn (born 26 April 1983 in Colonia del Sacramento) is an Uruguayan competition rower.

He competed in three Summer Olympics for his native South American country: 2004, 2008 and 2012, and in three Pan American Games: 2003, 2007 and 2011.

He was also named Uruguay's flagbearer for the 2012 Summer Olympics.

References

External links
 
 

1983 births
Living people
People from Rosario, Uruguay
Uruguayan male rowers
Rowers at the 2007 Pan American Games
Rowers at the 2011 Pan American Games
Rowers at the 2004 Summer Olympics
Rowers at the 2008 Summer Olympics
Rowers at the 2012 Summer Olympics
Olympic rowers of Uruguay
Rowers at the 2015 Pan American Games
Pan American Games silver medalists for Uruguay
Pan American Games medalists in rowing
South American Games gold medalists for Uruguay
South American Games silver medalists for Uruguay
South American Games bronze medalists for Uruguay
South American Games medalists in rowing
Competitors at the 2002 South American Games
Competitors at the 2006 South American Games
Competitors at the 2010 South American Games
Medalists at the 2003 Pan American Games